Nothochrysa californica, the San Francisco lacewing, is a species of green lacewing in the family Chrysopidae. It is found in North America.

References

Further reading

 
 

Chrysopidae
Articles created by Qbugbot
Insects described in 1892